is a song by Japanese pop singer Kyary Pamyu Pamyu. Used as the fifteenth opening theme song for the anime Crayon Shin-chan, it was released as a double A-side single alongside "Furisodation" on January 30, 2013. This also appears on Nanda Collection

Background and development 
In May 2012, Kyary Pamyu Pamyu released her debut studio album Pamyu Pamyu Revolution, followed by the single "Fashion Monster" in October. Both releases were commercially successful, with the Recording Industry Association of Japan certifying Pamyu Pamyu Revolution gold and "Fashion Monster" platinum. On December 31, Kyary Pamyu Pamyu performed at the 63rd NHK Kōhaku Uta Gassen, her first appearance at the annual new year's music competition. Also in December, Kyary Pamyu Pamyu's 100% KPP World Tour 2013 was announced, beginning in Belgium in February.

The song was revealed on October 6, when Kyary Pamyu Pamyu announced the song's use in the anime during her performance at the TV Asahi Dream Festival. The "Kimi ni 100 Percent" / "Furisodation" single was announced in December. In 2014 for the film Crayon Shin-chan: Serious Battle! Robot Dad Strikes Back, a second song of hers was used for the theme song, "Family Party".

"Kimi ni 100 Percent" was written to have lyrics that would make children happy. Kyary Pamyu Pamyu found the melody simple to remember, so sung the song a lot smoother than she had in past recordings. The song is the second of hers to feature "100%" in the title, after , the B-side to her "Fashion Monster" single.

Promotion and release 
The song began being used in the opening sequences of Crayon Shin-chan in October 2012. The minute long clip of the song broadcast during the series was released as a digital download on December 7. Kyary Pamyu Pamyu made a cameo appearance on the January 25 episode of Crayon Shin-chan, voicing a character drawn in her likeness. On the same day, Kyary Pamyu Pamyu performed the song at Music Station live, alongside the characters of Crayon Shin-chan. This was the first time in the anime's 22-year history that program's characters had appeared to perform a song alongside a theme song's singer.

On January 28, an Asobisystem event held at AgeHa in Shin-Kiba, Tokyo was held to celebrate Kyary Pamyu Pamyu's 20th birthday, featuring performances by musicians such as Yasutaka Nakata, Ram Rider and Kyary Pamyu Pamyu herself. This was followed by a mini-tour, featuring a performance in Tokyo on January 30 and two performances in Nagoya and Osaka on February 2.

Unlike Kyary Pamyu Pamyu's other singles, "Kimi ni 100 Percent" did not receive a music video.

Cover artwork 
In addition to the "Furisodation"-related single covers showing "Kyary as an adult", a Crayon Shin-chan version of the single was released. This edition features a caricature of Kyary Pamyu Pamyu in the same art style as the Crayon Shin-chan manga and anime, drawn by artist at the Groovisions design studio.

Critical reception 
Rolling Stone Japan reviewer Kazumi Nanba gave the "Kimi ni 100 Percent" / "Furisodation" single 3.5 stars out of five, calling the song "relaxed and light" and completely different to "Furisodation". He praised Kyary Pamyu Pamyu's vocal technique of not strictly matching the melody and very slightly differing as "technical" and felt it was a sign of Kyary Pamyu Pamyu's rapid growth as a vocalist. CDJournal reviewers described it as a "game pop song with Kyary's full-on charms", and felt that the song had a fairy tale feel, due to the "dance flavor" hiding away the darkness of the world.

Track listings

Personnel
Personnel details were sourced from the "Kimi ni 100 Percent" / "Furisodation" liner notes booklet.

Kyary Pamyu Pamyu – vocals
Yasutaka Nakata – writer, arranger, producer, recorder, mixing, mastering

Chart rankings

Sales and certifications

Release history

References 

2013 singles
2013 songs
Crayon Shin-chan
Japanese-language songs
Kyary Pamyu Pamyu songs
Song recordings produced by Yasutaka Nakata
Songs written by Yasutaka Nakata
Unborde singles